P. Narayanan (January 31, 1951 - August 6, 2020) was an Indian politician and leader of Communist Party of India. He represented Vaikom constituency in 10th KLA and 11th KLA.

References

Communist Party of India politicians from Kerala
1951 births
2020 deaths
Kerala MLAs 1996–2001
Kerala MLAs 2001–2006